Arthur Charles Jahn (December 2, 1895 – January 9, 1948) was an outfielder in Major League Baseball. He played for the Chicago Cubs, New York Giants, and Philadelphia Phillies.

In 104 games over two seasons, Jahn posted a .278 batting average (97-for-349) with 45 runs, 1 home run and 55 RBI. He finished his career with a .985 fielding percentage as an outfielder.

References

External links

1895 births
1948 deaths
Major League Baseball outfielders
Chicago Cubs players
New York Giants (NL) players
Philadelphia Phillies players
Minor league baseball managers
Baseball players from Iowa